Álvaro Cejudo Carmona (born 29 January 1984) is a Spanish former professional footballer who played mainly as a right winger.

Formed at Betis, he amassed La Liga totals of 156 matches and 12 goals over six seasons, with that club and Osasuna. He also played in Australia, with Western Sydney Wanderers.

Club career

Early years and Las Palmas
Born in Puente Genil, Córdoba, Cejudo played youth football with Real Betis but only appeared officially with the B side, competing with them in both Segunda División B and Tercera División. Leaving in the summer of 2007, he joined AD Ceuta at the latter level, where he spent two seasons.

In July 2009, Cejudo signed with UD Las Palmas from Segunda División. He played his first game as a professional on 29 August and scored in a 1–1 home draw with Real Sociedad, finishing his first year with 34 matches and six goals to help the Canary Islands team narrowly avoid relegation.

Osasuna
Cejudo moved to La Liga with CA Osasuna in the 2011 January transfer window, agreeing to a €320,000 deal in order to replace Atlético Madrid-bound Juanfran. He netted his first goal in the competition on 21 May, the game's only at home against Villarreal CF.

Betis
On 11 August 2014, Cejudo returned to Betis after agreeing to a three-year deal. He contributed 30 games and one goal in his first season, helping the club return to the top division after a one-year absence.

Cejudo appeared in the same number of matches the following campaign, scoring in a 1–1 home draw against Real Madrid.

Western Sydney Wanderers
On 24 July 2017, after failing to renew his contract, the 33-year-old Cejudo joined A-League team Western Sydney Wanderers FC as a marquee player. At the end of the season, he was released.

Racing Santander
On 28 July 2018, Cejudo returned to Spain and joined Racing de Santander on a two-year contract. In May 2021, having experienced one promotion and one relegation, the 37-year-old announced his retirement.

Career statistics

Honours
Betis
Segunda División: 2014–15

References

External links

1984 births
Living people
People from Campiña Sur (Córdoba)
Sportspeople from the Province of Córdoba (Spain)
Spanish footballers
Footballers from Andalusia
Association football wingers
La Liga players
Segunda División players
Segunda División B players
Tercera División players
Betis Deportivo Balompié footballers
Coria CF players
AD Ceuta footballers
UD Las Palmas players
CA Osasuna players
Real Betis players
Racing de Santander players
A-League Men players
Western Sydney Wanderers FC players
Marquee players (A-League Men)
Spanish expatriate footballers
Expatriate soccer players in Australia
Spanish expatriate sportspeople in Australia